Zhang Shuai was the two-time defending champion and successfully defended her title, defeating Mihaela Buzărnescu in the final, 6–4, 6–0.

Seeds

Draw

Finals

Top half

Bottom half

References
Main Draw

Ando Securities Open - Singles